The 2019 Japanese Grand Prix (formally known as the Formula 1 Japanese Grand Prix 2019) was a Formula One racing event held on 13 October 2019 at the Suzuka International Racing Course in Suzuka in the Mie Prefecture, Japan. The race was the 17th round of the 2019 Formula One World Championship and marked the 45th running of the Japanese Grand Prix. The 2019 event was the 35th time that the race had been run as a World Championship event since the inaugural season in 1950, and the 31st time that it had been held at Suzuka.

Background 
Formally called the "Formula 1 Japanese Grand Prix 2019", this Formula One Grand Prix event took place on 13 October 2019 at the Suzuka International Racing Course in Japan. Going into the race, the lap record, of 1 minute 31.540 seconds, was held by Kimi Räikkönen who took it at the 2005 Grand Prix.

Weather
Due to the weather forecasts relating to Typhoon Hagibis, all the events planned for Saturday were cancelled. This included the Free Practice 3 session and qualifying, the latter of which was rescheduled for Sunday morning, a few hours before the race was due to start.

Championship standings before the race
Heading into the 17th round of the championship, Mercedes driver Lewis Hamilton led the Drivers' Championship with 322 points, 73 points ahead of teammate Valtteri Bottas. Third in the Drivers' Championship was Ferrari's driver Charles Leclerc with 215 points, with Max Verstappen from Red Bull Racing and Leclerc's teammate Sebastian Vettel in fourth and fifth places respectively. In the Constructors' Championship, Mercedes held a 162-point lead over second place Ferrari, with Red Bull Racing in third place. McLaren and Renault completed the top five.

Entrants

The drivers and teams were the same as the season entry list with no additional stand-in drivers for the race. However, Japanese driver Naoki Yamamoto drove in the first practice session for Scuderia Toro Rosso, replacing Pierre Gasly. As a result, Yamamoto became the first Japanese driver in F1 since Kamui Kobayashi.

Qualifying
Qualifying began on Sunday morning at 10:00am JST (UTC+9:00), just over 4 hours before the race was due to start. The skies were clear after Typhoon Hagibis had passed the previous day, however, there were still heavy winds affecting the circuit.

Q1

Two minutes into the session Robert Kubica hit the outside wall at the exit of turn 18 after running wide onto the grass destroying the car's front wing and left-hand wheels and causing significant damage to the survival cell. Kubica was uninjured and the session was red-flagged whilst his car was recovered and debris was cleared from the track. Four minutes after the session restarted Kevin Magnussen spun at the same corner causing him to reverse into the outside wall, damaging his gearbox, front and rear wings. The red flags came out again, however, Magnussen was able to continue driving completing a lap and entering the pits. Neither Kubica nor Magnussen were able to set a qualifying time, however, Williams and Haas were able to repair their respective cars before the beginning of the race with Kubica starting from the pit lane after his survival cell was replaced. Charles Leclerc set the fastest time of Q1 whilst Daniel Ricciardo, Sergio Pérez and George Russell were eliminated alongside Kubica and Magnussen.

Q2

After setting the 15th fastest time, Nico Hülkenberg's car suffered a loss of hydraulic pressure causing him to be stuck in gear. Hülkenberg slowly returned to the pits and his car was retired from the session. Valtteri Bottas set the fastest time of Q2 with Antonio Giovinazzi, Lance Stroll, Kimi Räikkönen and Daniil Kvyat being eliminated alongside Hülkenberg.

Q3

Sebastian Vettel took pole position ahead of Leclerc and Bottas. This was Vettel's first pole position since the Canadian Grand Prix and the fifth consecutive pole position for Ferrari. The team took their 64th front-row lockout, equalling Mercedes's record. The pole position time of 1:27.064, which was set by the German driver, meaning the fastest ever lap made in Suzuka, beating the previous best ever lap of 1:27.319, which was set by Lewis Hamilton during the qualifying of the 2017 edition. Vettel's pole would eventually turn out to be his final in Formula One.

Qualifying classification 

Notes
  – Max Verstappen and Alexander Albon set identical times in Q3; Verstappen was classified ahead as he set his lap time earlier.
  – Kevin Magnussen and Robert Kubica both failed to set a Q1 time. They were allowed to race at the stewards discretion. Kubica was also required to start the race from the pit lane for changing his survival cell.

Race 
At the start of the race Sebastian Vettel, on pole position, moved a fraction of a second too early. He was able to stop before overstepping his grid line, but this led to a poor start and the Ferrari was passed by the Mercedes of Valtteri Bottas almost immediately. Vettel was investigated for a false start, however the stewards later decided against penalising him given that he did not overstep his line and thus the sensors used to detect a false start were not triggered. Max Verstappen attempted an overtake on the outside of Charles Leclerc through turn 2 for 3rd place, however, Leclerc understeered into Verstappen causing the Red Bull to spin out onto the grass. The collision resulted in significant damage to Verstappen's car and to Leclerc's front wing (also his left wing mirror), although both cars were able to continue racing.

Leclerc was instructed by his team to enter the pits at the end of the opening lap, however, he was not aware of the damage to his front wing and stayed out on track as the damaged front wing wasn't affecting his performance significantly. Over the course of the second lap pieces of Leclerc's front wing broke off before the endplate detached entirely on the straight after turn 14, this endplate then hit Lewis Hamilton's car, which was directly behind him, breaking off one of the Mercedes's wing mirrors. After initially informing the stewards that Leclerc would pit at the end of lap 2 the team felt his car was now safe and instructed him to stay out for a third lap after which the race director ordered the car be brought into the pits to change its front wing. On lap 2 the stewards deemed the collision between Leclerc and Verstappen a racing incident with no investigation necessary.

On lap 4 Alexander Albon attempted an overtake on the inside of Lando Norris at turn 16. The cars collided and Norris was left with floor damage harming his pace for the rest of the race. The incident was not investigated by the stewards. Norris had also earlier collected debris from Leclerc's front wing in his brake ducts which forced him to pit to avoid a brake fire dropping him to the back of the field. On lap 7 the stewards decided to re-open the investigation into the lap 1 collision between Leclerc and Verstappen, later deciding that the incident would be investigated after the race. Both drivers were by now attempting to come back through the field with Leclerc passing Verstappen for 16th place on lap 9. Verstappen's car was later retired from the race on lap 14 after having only managed to pass the two Williams cars with the team deciding that the damage from the opening lap incident was too great to continue.

On lap 15 Albon was the first of the front-runners to make a pit stop from 5th place, Vettel then pitted on lap 16 from 2nd place as did Bottas from the lead on lap 17 causing Hamilton to inherit the race lead. Hamilton pitted on lap 21 handing the lead back to Bottas and restoring the order of the top three. Hamilton was fitted with medium-compound tyres with the team informing him that the plan was for him not to make another pit stop. This was despite degradation from previous laps meaning that he was now over 20 seconds behind the race leader. This made it improbable that Hamilton would be able to stay close enough to the leaders for him to take the race lead when Bottas and Vettel made an additional pit stop if Hamilton would have to preserve his tyres to last till the end of the race. Hamilton criticised the decision not to use hard-compound tyres, telling the team over radio "I'm out of the race now" after the team admitted that it was likely that Hamilton would have to make a second pit stop.

Carlos Sainz made his pit stop from 4th place on lap 26 emerging behind Albon, meaning the Red Bull had gained a position over Sainz through the pit stops. Vettel made a second pit stop on lap 31 emerging in 3rd place. By lap 34 Leclerc had made it past Pierre Gasly and into 6th place from the back of the field. Bottas made his second stop on lap 36 coming out in 2nd place behind Hamilton. Hamilton was later pitted on lap 42 emerging in 3rd place behind Vettel. Leclerc was unable to keep up with Sainz's McLaren in the closing laps and the team decided to pit him on lap 47 for an attempt to claim the point for fastest lap.

On the final lap Sergio Pérez attempted an overtake around the outside of Gasly for 8th place at turn 2. The two cars collided sending Pérez into the gravel. Under normal conditions Pérez would have been classified in 17th place as the two Williams cars were a lap behind him. However, the chequered flag lighting panels had mistakenly been shown to the leaders a lap early meaning that the results of the race were taken from the end of the 52nd lap. Thus, Pérez kept 9th place. Hamilton spent the closing laps attempting to catch and overtake Vettel but was ultimately unsuccessful. However, Hamilton was able to claim the fastest lap point. With Bottas crossing the line to take victory, Leclerc, Verstappen and Vettel were eliminated from the Drivers' Championship title contention.

After the race, Leclerc was handed two penalties: a 5-second penalty for causing the collision with Verstappen, and a 10-second penalty for driving in an unsafe condition in the following laps. This demoted him to 7th place behind Daniel Ricciardo. Racing Point submitted a protest to the stewards over alleged illegal use of a "pre-set lap distance-dependent brake bias adjustment system" by Renault. On 23 October, ten days after the race, Renault was found to have used illegal driver aids and both drivers were disqualified from the results of the race, hence Leclerc kept his 6th place.

On lap 45, Lewis Hamilton scored the new race lap record in Suzuka, with a time of 1:30.983, beating the previous race lap record time of 1:31.540, which was set by Kimi Räikkönen at the 2005 Japanese Grand Prix. The win for Bottas was also the first for a Finnish driver in the event since Räikkönen's 2005 win.

Race classification 

Notes
  – The race was scheduled to run 53 laps, but the results were taken at the end of lap 52 due to the chequered flag signal being mistakenly shown to drivers one lap too early. As a result, Sergio Pérez retained his ninth place, despite retiring from the race during the final scheduled lap. This later became eighth place after the disqualification of both Renault drivers.
  – Includes one point for fastest lap.
  – Charles Leclerc received two time penalties: five seconds for causing a collision with Max Verstappen, and ten seconds for driving in an unsafe condition after the collision. After the disqualification of both Renault drivers, this did not affect his sixth-place finish.
  – Daniel Ricciardo and Nico Hülkenberg were originally classified sixth and tenth, but were disqualified ten days after the race for using illegal driver aids after a protest brought forward by Racing Point.

Championship standings after the race 

Drivers' Championship standings

Constructors' Championship standings

 Note: Only the top five positions are included for both sets of standings.
 Bold text indicates competitors who still had a theoretical chance of becoming World Champion.

References

Japanese
Grand Prix
Japanese Grand Prix
Japanese Grand Prix